James Bond (also Lemon, Atlantis or Chanhassen) is a matching card game where players compete to see who can assemble piles of four-of-a-kind the fastest.

Pagat.com describes it as a widespread children's game which "seems to be of fairly recent origin", and popular in California.

Deal 
Deal four cards face up in the middle. The remaining 48 cards of the deck are dealt out into face-down piles of four. In a two-player game, each player receives six of these piles to put in front of them; in a three-player game, they receive four.

The play 
When play begins each player views one pile of four cards. Players may trade cards in their hands with cards in the middle, as many as they like holding no more than four cards at a time. That is to say, players must discard to the middle first, and then select their new cards. Players may change as many cards (1-4) as they like. Players can, at any time, place their pile face down and pick up a different pile and continue to play. When a player has four of a kind in one pile, they place their pile face up.

A player wins when all their piles have four of a kind, are face up, and the player calls, "James Bond!" (or the name of the game, in the case of other versions).

Teams
An alternative version for four players is to play with two teams of two such that a pair of players shares six piles and can then view two piles simultaneously.

References

Commerce group
Card games for children